Elaphe zoigeensis is a species of snakes of the family Colubridae. It is endemic to Sichuan, China. Common name Zoige ratsnake has been coined for it.

Geographic range
The snake is found in Sichuan, China. Its type locality is in Zoigê County.

References 

Elaphe
Snakes of China
Endemic fauna of Sichuan
Reptiles described in 2012